Vavamuffin is a Polish raggamuffin, roots reggae and dancehall band from Warsaw. They were formed in 2003 and have released five albums under the label Karrot Kommando. The band members are Pablopavo, Reggaenerator, Gorg, Emili Jones, Jahcob Junior, Raffi Kazan, Mothashipp, Dubbist and Barton. They have participated in Przystanek Woodstock.

Discography

Albums

Video albums

References

External links

 Official band site (Polish)

Polish musical groups